Richwoods is an unincorporated community in northeastern Washington County, Missouri, United States. It is located on Missouri Route A one mile east of Missouri Route 47, approximately 15 miles west of De Soto and 19 miles south of St. Clair.

History
The first settlement at Richwoods was made ca. 1830. The community was named for the dense forest near the original town site. A post office has been in operation at Richwoods since 1832.

Education 
The Richwoods area is served by the Richwoods School District (R-7). They offer pre-school and kindergarten through eighth grade. After the completion of the eighth grade, students may choose to attend high schools in the following areas: Potosi, Grandview, Kingston, DeSoto, St. Clair, or Sullivan.

Churches and cemeteries 
The Book of Acts Church
Church Apostolic
Richwoods 1st Free Will Baptist Church
Cross Roads Baptist Church
The Way of Life Tabernacle
Horine Methodist church and cemetery

The St. Stephen Catholic Church parish and cemetery was established in 1841. St. Stephen Cemetery is located behind the church and rectory.

References

External links 
Richwoods R-7 School District
Richwoods Fire Protection District
Bear Cove Enterprises
St. Stephen Catholic Church

Unincorporated communities in Washington County, Missouri
Unincorporated communities in Missouri
1830 establishments in Missouri